Eupithecia subfumosa is a moth in the family Geometridae. It is found in Japan.

References

Moths described in 1965
subfumosa
Moths of Japan